Franz Reindl (born 24 November 1954) is a retired professional ice hockey player who played in the German Bundesliga. He was born in Garmisch-Partenkirchen, West Germany.

Reindl played for SC Riessersee his first 12 seasons of senior team hockey.  His best offensive season was 1981-2 when he scored 102 points in 43 games. He finished his career playing four seasons with Star Bulls Rosenheim.

Reindl won a bronze medal at the 1976 Winter Olympics playing for West Germany.  He also played at the 1984 Canada Cup.

References

External links
 
 
 
 

1954 births
Eishockey-Bundesliga players
Ice hockey players at the 1976 Winter Olympics
Ice hockey players at the 1980 Winter Olympics
Ice hockey players at the 1984 Winter Olympics
Living people
Medalists at the 1976 Winter Olympics
Olympic bronze medalists for West Germany
Olympic ice hockey players of West Germany
Olympic medalists in ice hockey
SC Riessersee players
Sportspeople from Garmisch-Partenkirchen
Starbulls Rosenheim players
West German ice hockey left wingers